Labidura is a genus of earwigs in the family Labiduridae. Probably the earliest specimen of Labidura was found in Eocene amber. One of the Labidura species, Saint Helena earwig (Labidura herculeana) was the largest of all earwigs before its possible extinction after the year of 1967.

Species
The genus contains the following species:

 Labidura cryptera Liu, 1946
 Labidura dharchulensis Gangola, 1968
 Labidura elegans Liu, 1946
 Labidura japonica (Haan, 1842)
 Labidura minor Boeseman, 1954
 Labidura orientalis Steinmann, 1979
 Labidura riparia (Pallas, 1773)
 Labidura xanthopus (Stal, 1855)
 Labidura herculeana (Fabricius, 1798)

References

Earwigs
Dermaptera genera
Taxa named by William Elford Leach